Steinhagen Bielefelder Straße is a railway station located in Steinhagen, Germany. The station is on the Osnabrück–Brackwede railway. The train services are operated by NordWestBahn.

Train services 
The following services currently call at Steinhagen Bielefelder Straße:

References 

Railway stations in North Rhine-Westphalia
Railway stations in Germany opened in 2000